Impractical Jokers: The Movie is a 2020 American reality comedy film directed by Chris Henchy, based on the truTV television series Impractical Jokers. The film stars Brian Quinn, James Murray, Sal Vulcano, and Joe Gatto, also known as The Tenderloins. It was theatrically released on February 21, 2020. The film received generally mixed reviews and was a box office success, grossing $10 million against a budget of $3 million.

Plot
In 1994 Staten Island, a group of four teenage friends, Joe, Sal, Murr and Q sneak into a Paula Abdul concert disguised as security personnel. However, they accidentally ruin the concert after Joe jumps out on stage and poorly acts as a hype man. The outcome embarrasses them and angers Abdul, who delivers a clothesline blow to Sal and vows to get her revenge on the Jokers. However, the incident inspires them to do practical joke challenges as a comedy gimmick.

Twenty-five years later in 2019, the four have become famous celebrities as a result of their TV show, Impractical Jokers, but are surprised to see Abdul at a Red Lobster. Abdul approaches but admits that she is a huge fan of the show, and invites them to a party in Miami. However, shortly after Paula leaves, the group realizes she gave them only three tickets instead of four, meaning that one person will not be able to go. In order to decide who will be left out, they decide to road trip to Miami using Q's Crown Vic. while competing with each other in hidden-camera challenges; the one who loses will not get the ticket.

Some of the major challenges include: reading a eulogy to folks outside the Lincoln Memorial in Washington DC and getting the listeners' approval; on a boat ride near Myrtle Beach in the Carolina coast, convincing passengers not to pick up someone in distress; getting roadside assistance from strangers; and interviewing for a staff job with the Atlanta Hawks while being fed silly actions and lines by the others. Individual challenges and pranks also arise. Sal gets locked in a motel room with a chained white tiger. Q has to ride a horse while wearing a gladiator uniform to meet with the others. Murr visits a club with scantily-clad women only to be surprised with his family wishing him happy birthday behind a two way mirror. Joe dresses like a cave troll to surprise a tour group. Q gives a presentation at a social media conference but the videotape footage includes a bit of his real parents acting out lead-in scenes of softcore porn. Sal attends a fan party featuring Jaden Smith, dressed as Jaden's number-one fan. He shows off his tattoo of Smith from a previous season to him, but Smith has Sal get an updated one on his other thigh.

When they arrive in Miami, Murr ends up being the loser, so he has to stay behind while the others go to the party, until Murr decides to sneak into the show using the same security disguise from 1994. This results in Abdul recognizing them from when they crashed her concert 25 years ago. Sal gets tasered but Joe acts as a hype man and sways the crowd to cheer for them. The next day, with Joey Fatone in the background at Miami Beach, Joe tells the Jokers that he received an offer to go on tour with Abdul as a hype man, but turned it down. Since Murr snuck into the party, the others decide to subject him to one last punishment. Joe, Q, and Sal fly back to Staten Island on a private jet, while Murr rides harnessed to the top wing of a stunt plane.

Cast
 Joe Gatto as himself
 James Murray as himself
 Brian Quinn as himself
 Sal Vulcano as himself
 Paula Abdul as herself
 Jaden Smith as himself
 Joey Fatone as himself

Kane Hodder plays Paula Abdul's bodyguard. Will Ferrell has a cameo as Miami Restaurant Guy #4. Jokers television producer Casey Jost portrays Sam as part of Abdul's entourage.

Production

The film was produced by The Tenderloins, Chris Henchy (who also served as the director), Buddy Enright and Funny or Die's Jim Ziegler. The film was executively produced by Mike Farah and Joe Farrell of Funny or Die, Marissa Ronca, Chris Linn & Jack Rovner. Henchy said that he had first heard of the Tenderloins group as his daughters were watching the Impractical Jokers TV show, and was contacted by his agent about two weeks later with an offer to direct the film.

Principal photography for the film began in May 2018, in New York. The cinematographers used professional sound and video quality unlike the TV show to make the movie have a better aesthetic. Filming concluded on June 5, 2018.

Release
On September 20, 2019, it was announced that the film would be released in 2020 through WarnerMedia. In December, TruTV released a trailer and announced a February 21, 2020 release in select theaters.

Initially intended to be released digitally in late 2020, TruTV released the film on April 1, 2020, due to nationwide shutdown of theaters amid the coronavirus pandemic in the United States. The film has also become available on HBO Max since being released on the service on September 1, 2020.

Reception

Box office
The film made $2.6 million from 357 theaters in its opening weekend. The film was added to 1,543 theaters in its second weekend and made $3.5 million, finishing seventh.

Critical response
On Metacritic, the film has a weighted average score of 39 out of 100, based on five critics, indicating "generally unfavorable reviews."

Mark Keizer of Variety called it "an undistinguished and unnecessary extension of a brand whose primary attributes are likability, authenticity and relative modesty (given the worst impulses of the genre)."
John DeFore of The Hollywood Reporter questioned why anyone "would get off the couch and spend money" to see this film.

Film critique Nick Allen gave the film a positive review rating it 3.5 stars out of 5, stating that "Comedies never get fair ratings. While the scripted plot seems pretty lame, the show itself is very funny and what I'd consider 3 1/2 star".

References

External links
 
 

2020 comedy films
2020 films
American comedy films
2020s English-language films
Films based on television series
Funny or Die
Impractical Jokers
The Tenderloins
Films shot in New York (state)
Films set in 1994
Films set in Staten Island
2020s American films